New Zealand competed at the 2007 World Championships in Athletics with a team of ten athletes. Valerie Vili won New Zealand's only medal with a gold medal in the women's shot put.

New Zealand Team

Results

Men
Track and road events

Field events

Women
Track and road events

Field and combined events

Nations at the 2007 World Championships in Athletics
New Zealand at the World Championships in Athletics
World Championships in Athletics